Rosengren is a Swedish-language surname.

Geographical distribution
As of 2014, 62.5% of all known bearers of the surname Rosengren were residents of Sweden (frequency 1:2,789), 20.8% of the United States (1:307,186), 5.3% of Denmark (1:18,878), 2.7% of Finland (1:35,463), 2.7% of Australia (1:156,407), 2.5% of Canada (1:264,734) and 1.6% of Norway (1:57,137).

In Sweden, the frequency of the surname was higher than national average (1:2,789) in the following counties:
 1. Skåne County (1:1,261)
 2. Örebro County (1:1,558)
 3. Kalmar County (1:1,608)
 4. Halland County (1:2,389)
 5. Norrbotten County (1:2,533)
 6. Gotland County (1:2,658)

In Denmark, the frequency of the surname was higher than national average (1:18,878) in the following regions:
 1. North Denmark Region (1:7,481)
 2. Region Zealand (1:11,129)
 3. Capital Region of Denmark (1:18,725)

In Finland, the frequency of the surname was higher than national average (1:35,463) in the following regions:
 1. Satakunta (1:7,115)
 2. Ostrobothnia (1:13,369)
 3. Pirkanmaa (1:16,485)
 4. Southwest Finland (1:18,998)

People
Bernt Rosengren (born 1937), Swedish jazz tenor saxophonist
Birgit Rosengren (1912–2011), Swedish film actress
Björn Rosengren (born 1942), Swedish Social Democratic politician
Eric S. Rosengren (born 1957), president and chief executive officer of the Federal Reserve Bank of Boston
Erik Rosengren (1908–1988), Swedish Army lieutenant general
Håkan Rosengren, Swedish clarinet virtuoso
John Rosengren (born 1964), American writer and author
Patrik Rosengren (born 1971), Swedish footballer
Per Rosengren, (1951–), is a Swedish Left Party politician and teacher
Rhonda Rosengren, New Zealand toxicology academic
Sabina Rosengren Jacobsen, Swedish team handball player

See also
Roseingrave
Rosengarten (disambiguation)

References

Swedish-language surnames